The Invisible Circus is a play by Sumner Locke Elliott set in the world of radio drama. A production by John Carlson ran for six weeks at the Independent Theatre, Sydney in 1946. and in Melbourne later that year by the Little Theatre produced by Irene Mitchell.

References

Notes

External links

Australian plays
1946 plays